Endless Love is a 2014 American romantic drama film directed by Shana Feste and co-written by Feste with Joshua Safran. A second adaptation of Scott Spencer's novel (following the 1981 movie starring Brooke Shields), the film stars Alex Pettyfer, Gabriella Wilde, Bruce Greenwood, Joely Richardson, and Robert Patrick.

The film was released on February 14, 2014, by Universal Pictures in the US and UK, and on February 13, 2014, in Australia.

Plot

17-year-old Jade Butterfield graduates from high school with an impressive college scholarship but few friends, focusing on her studies rather than a social life. David, another senior, has had a crush on her for years but never acted on it.

Jade asks her parents, Hugh and Anne, for a graduation party as her gift, which is very unlike her. She invites the entire class, including David. At first, the party consists of only Mr. and Mrs. Butterfield's friends. However, David comes and gets everyone to go to Jade's by sabotaging another.

The night is full of music, laughter and dancing. Jade and David are caught kissing in a closet during a power outage when Jade's father, Hugh, toasts Jade. They exit the closet together, seen by all. Hugh disapproves of David, feeling he will adversely affect his daughter's medical-school internship.

David tries to please Hugh by fixing a car which belonged to Jade's late brother Chris; ironically, Hugh is the only one not delighted by this gesture. Late that night, Jade sneaks David into the study where - at her urging - they make love. They strive to make the most of the ten days she has left at home. Ultimately, Jade opts to decline the internship to spend the summer with David, infuriating Hugh. She later invites David to accompany the family to their lake house; he is welcomed warmly by everybody but Hugh, who his wife Anne begs to give him a chance. She points out that Jade seems truly happy for the first time in ages.

One night, David sees Hugh cheating on Anne with another woman; and Hugh intimidates him into keeping quiet about it. David and Jade, along with Jade's brother Keith and his girlfriend Sabine, sneak into a local zoo after-hours for a night of fun. Jenny, David's jealous ex, calls the police; when they arrive, David sacrifices himself so the others can escape. Hugh bails David out, on the condition he ends it with Jade and she takes the internship as planned.

Jade escapes to find David at a restaurant where he's eating with his friend Mace, who secretly invited Jenny. Jade suddenly turns up, assumes the worst and upset, drives off and gets into an accident. At the hospital, Hugh gives Harry a restraining order to keep David away from Jade...who has suffered only minor injuries. Upon leaving the hospital, she tries to contact David - having realized he was never unfaithful to her and never would be. But his dad won't allow it because of the restraining order. Over the next few months, David and Jade each try to see other people; but both are unhappy.

David runs into Anne at a bookstore, and she tells him she admires his and Jade's love. She arranges for David to meet Jade at the airport when she comes home for the holidays. They reaffirm their love and Jade plans to go off with David that night, while Anne confronts Hugh about his obsession with destroying David's life; including Hugh never sending her college recommendation letter for him.

At home, Hugh reams Keith and Sabine for listening to records from Chris's collection. Keith seconds his mother's sentiments regarding what losing Chris has done to Hugh. Then Keith announces he is moving in with Sabine, and Anne opts to join them. Hugh then finds Jade preparing to leave with David; who is waiting outside. He charges in a rage, knocking over a lit candle on the way and furiously attacking David. Jade rushes to his defense, proclaiming that it was Hugh, not David; who tore the family apart.

The defeated Hugh goes back inside, discovering the fire started in Chris's room. Jade and David see the house in flames, so he rushes back in to save Hugh, who is struggling to gather up Chris' possessions. When David falls unconscious, Hugh drops everything and helps him to safety instead. Outside, they put aside their differences while waiting for medical help.

Anne and Hugh amicably separate, but remain determined to rediscover their love, inspired by Jade and David; who are flying out to California, having been selected as maid of honor and best man at Sabine and Keith's wedding. Both couples celebrate on the beach, where they camp. Sharing David's bedroll, Jade fondly recalls how her first love - the relationship she shares with him - was everything all at once, the kind of undying love worth fighting to keep.

Cast
 Alex Pettyfer as David Elliot
 Gabriella Wilde as Jade Butterfield
 Bruce Greenwood as Hugh Butterfield
 Joely Richardson as Anne Butterfield
 Robert Patrick as Harry Elliot
 Rhys Wakefield as Keith Butterfield 
 Dayo Okeniyi as Mace
 Emma Rigby as Jenny
 Anna Enger as Sabine
 Patrick Johnson as Chris Butterfield
 Alexandra Bartee as Kelly
 Sharon Conley as Dr. Edie Watanabe
 Stephanie Northrup as Dawn Besser
 Matt Withers as Miles

Production
Emma Roberts was originally offered the role of Jade, but turned it down. Sophie Lowe, Gabriella Wilde, Sarah Bolger, and Olivia Cooke were on the final shortlist for the role; Wilde was ultimately cast.

Principal photography began in May 2013 in Georgia. Filming wrapped in July 2013. Scenes were shot in Savannah, Georgia, Fayette County, Georgia, Butts County, Georgia at Lake Jackson, and at the Atlanta Botanical Garden.

Release
The first trailer was released on December 23, 2013.

The film earned a domestic gross of $23,438,250, barely over its estimated production budget of $20 million.

Reception
Endless Love has received negative reviews from film critics. Criticism was mainly made towards the many liberties taken with the original source material. On Rotten Tomatoes the film has an approval rating of 16% based on 94 reviews, with the consensus: "Blander than the original Endless Love and even less faithful to the source material, this remake is clichéd and unintentionally silly." On Metacritic, the film has a score of 30 out of 100, based on 32 critics, indicating "generally unfavorable reviews" from critics.

Peter Travers of Rolling Stone wrote: "This Endless Love is a photo shoot, not a movie. It'd play better as a slideshow of jpgs. Even nine-year-old girls ought to cry foul on this movie's endless blandness."
Ronnie Scheib of Variety wrote: "In The Greatest (2009) and Country Strong (2010), Feste proved herself quite skilled, if not especially innovative, at limning her characters’ emotional travails. But subtlety, complexity and even the slightest modicum of realism elude her here."
Stephanie Merry of The Washington Post said "The movie feels like Nicholas Sparks fan fiction."

Film historian Leonard Maltin gave the remake a more positive review than the original, giving it two out of a possible four stars (he gave its 1981 predecessor zero out of four, rating it a "BOMB"). Yet he described the newer film as "Mediocre ... This is sure to connect with its target audience -- and it's Oscarworthy compared to the 1981 version -- yet it remains overwrought and pointless for fans of the novel. Moreover, Lionel Richie's title tune (the only memorable aspect of the original) is sorely missed here."

In 2013, after reading the screenplay for the film, Scott Spencer - the author of the novel on which the film was based - wrote that "It's about one hundred pages, and the only ones that were not dreary were sciatica inducing". In 2014 he wrote that his novel "has been even more egregiously and ridiculously misunderstood" in making the remake than in the 1981 film.

Soundtrack
End title track "Don't Find Another Love" was sung by Tegan and Sara and written by Golden Globe award-winning composer Julie Frost.  Singer/songwriter Skylar Grey's cover of Robert Palmer's "Addicted to Love" was used for the trailer of the film.  In addition, the song "Explosions" by Ellie Goulding was used in trailers adapted as television commercials. Another song which was taken is the track "Pumpin Blood" by the Swedish dance-pop group NoNoNo.

Director Shana Feste had considered using the original film's iconic theme song in one scene but eventually decided against it.

See also

 Endless Love (1981 film)
Menstruation and culture

References

External links
 
 
 
 

2014 films
2010s coming-of-age films
2014 romantic drama films
2010s teen drama films
2010s teen romance films
Adultery in films
American coming-of-age films
Remakes of American films
American romantic drama films
American teen drama films
American teen romance films
Films about dysfunctional families
Films based on American novels
Films directed by Shana Feste
Films produced by Scott Stuber
Films shot in Georgia (U.S. state)
Films scored by Christophe Beck
Universal Pictures films
2010s English-language films
2010s American films